Kostas Konstantinidis (born 31 August 1972) is a former professional footballer who works as technical director of Greece national team. A defender, he spent most of his career in Greece and Germany. Born in Germany, he represented Greece internationally.

Career
Konstantinidis was born in Schorndorf, West Germany. As a youth he played for VfB Stuttgart before his family moved to Greece in 1985. Having established himself as a professional player with Pierikos Katerini, OFI Crete and Hertha BSC he went on to play in Germany for Hertha BSC, Hannover 96 and 1. FC Köln.

In March 2002 he was loaned to English Premier League side Bolton Wanderers. He made three appearances for the club and was sent off in his second appearance against Everton.

Coaching career
On 10 March 2009, it was announced by Greek Superleague club Skoda Xanthi that Konstantinidis would be their next assistant coach, starting from 1 July.

As of 2011 he was still with Xanthi, as their head of scouting.

In August 2019 he was appointed technical director of the Greece national team.

Honours
Hertha Berlin
DFL-Ligapokal: 2001, 2002

References

External links
 
 
 

1972 births
Living people
People from Schorndorf
Sportspeople from Stuttgart (region)
German people of Greek descent
Sportspeople of Greek descent
Citizens of Greece through descent
Greek footballers
Footballers from Baden-Württemberg
Association football defenders
Greece international footballers
Super League Greece players
Bundesliga players
2. Bundesliga players
Premier League players
Cypriot First Division players
Pierikos F.C. players
OFI Crete F.C. players
Panathinaikos F.C. players
Hertha BSC players
Bolton Wanderers F.C. players
Hannover 96 players
1. FC Köln players
Nea Salamis Famagusta FC players
Greek expatriate footballers
Greek expatriate sportspeople in England
Expatriate footballers in England
Greek expatriate sportspeople in Cyprus
Expatriate footballers in Cyprus